Hux or HUX may refer to:
 Bahías de Huatulco International Airport (airport code: HUX), in the state of Oaxaca, Mexico
 Armitage Hux, a First Order general in the Star Wars universe
 Hux, a short film by Mageina Tovah
 Hux Records, a British record label
 Nüpode Huitoto language (language code: hux), spoken in Peru